John Dennis McDonald (December 5, 1906 – December 23, 1998) was an American journalist, writer, editor, business historian, fisherman, and horse racing enthusiast.

After being a radical Trotzkyite in the 1930s, McDonald joined Fortune magazine's staff in 1945, writing articles and later books about, among other topics, business, economics, games and gambling, and fly fishing.

Awards

 1976 Gerald Loeb Memorial Award for excellence in business journalism

References 

 John D. McDonald, 92, Author of a Classic on Business Strategy (Obituary), by David Cay Johnston, The New York Times, January 4, 1999
 Guide to the John McDonald Papers at Yale University, including a detailed biography

External links 
John McDonald Papers. General Collection, Beinecke Rare Book and Manuscript Library, Yale University.

American male non-fiction writers
20th-century American journalists
American male journalists
1906 births
1998 deaths
Gerald Loeb Memorial Award winners
20th-century American male writers